Hardwicke was the name of an agricultural and whaling community set up at Port Ross, a natural harbour on Auckland Island in the Auckland Islands in the Southern Ocean, south of New Zealand. Although a short-lived settlement was established, it was abandoned within three years.

History 
This colonial settlement was first proposed in 1846. The Southern Whale Fishery Company was formed in Britain and granted a Royal Charter with its founder, Charles Enderby, as the resident chief commissioner and lieutenant governor of the new colony. Charles Enderby was the son of Samuel Enderby, founder of the London whaling company Samuel Enderby & Sons.

The Enderby Settlement was the start of the establishment of Hardwicke, the intended ship provisioning and whaling station in Erebus Cove, Port Ross, at the north-eastern end of Auckland Island, close to Enderby Island.

Settlement began in December 1849.  Three ships, the Samuel Enderby, Fancy and Brisk from Britain arrived at Port Ross with the intending colonists, prefabricated houses and bricks with which to build chimneys. The settlers were carefully chosen to establish the new colony.  They included women and children as well as farm workers, shipwrights, a surgeon, a civil engineer and other people with appropriate skills.

When the colonists arrived at Port Ross they found a group of Ngāti Mutunga settlers, with their Moriori slaves from the Chatham Islands, already there, having arrived in 1842. The new colonists compensated the Māori for enough land to build their colony, and then to help clear the forest, build roads and crew the ships, with the chiefs Matioro and Manutere (sometimes called Ngatere) appointed as constables to maintain law and order.

In January 1850, the settlement was officially named "Hardwicke" after the Earl of Hardwicke, the governor of the company. Two farm sites were chosen, one on Auckland Island and the other on Enderby Island.  However crops were difficult to grow because of poor soils, harsh climate and high rainfall. Livestock were hard to muster in the thick scrub.  Whaling was also unproductive. Within three years, special commissioners from the whaling company decided to close the settlement as it was too expensive to maintain.

It was abandoned in August 1852, after a period of two years and nine months during which five weddings, sixteen births and two infant deaths had taken place. In 1854, the island was also abandoned by Māori, most of whom resettled on Stewart Island, with the remainder returning to the Chathams. Most of Hardwicke's buildings were disassembled and removed, leaving little evidence that settlement had occurred – the prefabricated buildings were later auctioned off in Sydney.

References 

Auckland Islands
Former populated places in New Zealand
Geography of the Auckland Islands
History of the New Zealand outlying islands
Whaling in New Zealand
1849 establishments in New Zealand
1852 disestablishments in New Zealand
Populated places established in 1849